Marinko "Mick" Vukota (born September 14, 1966) is a Canadian former professional ice hockey right wing. He is perhaps best known for playing 10 seasons with the New York Islanders of the National Hockey League, where he played the role of an enforcer.

Playing career

Undrafted, Vukota signed with the New York Islanders, who were looking to add toughness to their roster,  on March 2, 1987. Vukota worked his way up through their system and found himself skating on NHL ice by the end of the 1987–88 season, and scoring his first goal. He also registered 82 penalty minutes in 17 games. Over the next decade, Vukota forged a reputation as a tough scrapper and punishing forechecker who could occasionally score a goal. He was suspended several times by the league for on-ice incidents, and this added to his growing reputation. He went on to become the Islanders' career penalty minutes leader with 1,879, but his one-dimensional style resulted in a demotion to the Utah Grizzlies of the IHL in 1996–97. He split the 1997–98 season between the Tampa Bay Lightning and Montreal Canadiens in what was his last year in the NHL, surpassing 2,000 career penalty minutes, and then played two more seasons with the Grizzlies in the IHL before retiring.

Despite not being a major goal scorer, with only 17 career goals across 575 NHL matches, he did score a hat trick against the Washington Capitals, in a 5-3 Islanders win at the Capital Centre, on October 20, 1989.

Career statistics

Regular season and playoffs

See also
List of NHL players with 2000 career penalty minutes

References

External links
 

1966 births
Living people
Canadian ice hockey forwards
Canadian people of Serbian descent
Capital District Islanders players
Sportspeople from Saskatoon
Kelowna Wings players
Montreal Canadiens players
New York Islanders players
Spokane Chiefs players
Springfield Indians players
Tampa Bay Lightning players
Undrafted National Hockey League players
Utah Grizzlies (IHL) players
Winnipeg Warriors (1980–1984) players
Ice hockey people from Saskatchewan
Canadian expatriate ice hockey players in the United States